Woodlesford railway station serves Woodlesford and Rothwell in West Yorkshire, England.

Facilities
The station is unstaffed, but a self-service ticket machine is provided to allow passengers to buy before travelling or collect advance purchase tickets.  The platforms are staggered either side of the (now disused) foot crossing, with the Leeds-bound platform the more northerly of the two.  Waiting shelters, timetable posters and digital CIS displays are provided on each platform, with automated announcements also offered to give train running information.  Step-free access is available to both platforms (via the ramps on the footbridge for platform 2).

Service
Monday to Saturdays there is a half-hourly service to Leeds and an hourly service to Sheffield on the Hallam Line and hourly towards Knottingley on the Pontefract Line.  A single through train to  runs in the evening.

Sundays, there is an hourly service to Leeds and train every two hours to Sheffield and Knottingley respectively.

History
The station was opened in 1840 and formed part of the original North Midland Railway from Derby to Leeds built by George Stephenson. During the early 20th century, coal trains from the nearby Water Haigh colliery provided regular goods traffic, as did the Armitage Quarries and Bentley's Yorkshire Brewery which had their own sidings. Parcels headed for the nearby town of Rothwell were unloaded here.

For much of its life, the station had a Midland Railway building on the northbound platform that housed the booking hall, waiting room and station master's office, along with a signal box (dating from 1899) at the end of the southbound platform. Both were demolished in the early 1970s  - the former in 1971 (after the station had been downgraded to an unmanned halt the previous year) and the latter after its abolition in January 1972.

In late 2010 a footbridge was erected at the station to replace the crossing.

Accidents and incidents
In 1850, a train was in a rear-end collision with an excursion train at the station. The cause was a signal not being lit at night.

References

External links

 The Story of Woodlesford Station http://www.woodlesfordstation.co.uk

Railway stations in Leeds
DfT Category F1 stations
Former Midland Railway stations
Railway stations in Great Britain opened in 1840
Northern franchise railway stations
Rothwell, West Yorkshire